Khirkiya railway station is a railway station in Harda district, Madhya Pradesh. Its code is KKN. It serves Khirkiya town. The station consists of two platforms. It lacks many facilities including water and sanitation. Passenger and Express trains halt here.

References

Railway stations in Harda district
Bhopal railway division